The Desert Combat Uniform (DCU) is an arid-environment camouflage uniform that was used by the United States Armed Forces from the mid-1990s to the early 2010s. In terms of pattern and textile cut, it is identical to the U.S. military's Battle Dress Uniform (BDU) uniform, but features a three-color desert camouflage pattern of dark brown, pale olive green, and beige, as opposed to the four-color woodland pattern of the BDU. It replaced the previous Desert Battle Dress Uniform (DBDU) which featured a six-color "chocolate chip" pattern of beige, pale olive green, two tones of brown, and black and white rock spots. Although completely phased out of frontline use in the U.S. Armed Forces, some pieces and equipment printed in the DCU camouflage pattern are used in limited numbers such as MOPP suits and/or vests.

History

Developed in the late 1980s and first issued in very limited quantity in 1990 as experimental test patterns, the DCU and its camouflage scheme, officially known as the Desert Camouflage Pattern and known colloquially as "coffee stain camouflage", was developed to replace the six-color desert camouflage "chocolate-chip camouflage" uniform, which was deemed unsuitable for most desert combat theaters. As opposed to the original six-color DBDU, which was meant for a rockier and elevated desert battlefield that was often not encountered, the DCU was created primarily for a lower, more open, and less rocky desert battlefield space which became a common sight throughout the Persian Gulf War. As a replacement pattern, this meant a new arid region had to be utilized to test the effectiveness of the DCU. Desert soil samples from parts of the Middle East, namely Saudi Arabia, and Kuwait, were used as testing locations to find the appropriate color palettes.

Though the DCU did exist during the Persian Gulf War, the vast majority of U.S. military personnel in Saudi Arabia, Kuwait, and Iraq wore the DBDU during the entirety of the war, with the exception of some select U.S. Army generals who were issued the DCU a month following the air campaign in Operation Desert Storm. Norman Schwarzkopf, then CENTCOM commander, and leader of U.S. forces during Desert Storm, was issued an M-65 field jacket as well as coat and trousers in the new DCU color pattern shortly before the war ended.

By 1992, the first wide scale batches of DCUs were issued first by the United States Army, and within a year to the United States Air Force, and replaced the majority of the DBDU by 1993, with the United States Navy and Marines replacing their older six-colored desert fatigues from 1993 through 1995.

U.S. Army
First fielded in 1991, the DCU served as the U.S. Army's primary desert combat pattern from 1992 to 2004. In June 2004, the Army unveiled a new pixel-style camouflage pattern called UCP (Universal Camouflage Pattern), to be used on the DCU's successor uniform, the Army Combat Uniform (ACU).

In late 2004, some U.S. Army soldiers deployed in Iraq were issued the "Close Combat Uniform", a variant of the DCU that featured ACU-like features such as shoulder pockets affixed with hook-and-loop "Velcro" fasteners as well as a redesigned collar and chest-worn rank insignia. They were made by American Power Source, Inc. and only saw brief usage as they were issued shortly before the introduction of the newer ACU in mid-to-late 2005.

In mid-2005, the DCU and the BDU began slowly being discontinued within the U.S. Army. By 2007, most U.S. soldiers were wearing the ACU with both the DCU and BDU being fully replaced by early 2008.

U.S. Marine Corps
Following the Army, the United States Marine Corps began issuing the DCU from 1993 through 1995 and remained the Marine Corps standard arid combat uniform from 1993 to 2003. In January 2002, the U.S. Marine Corps became the first branch to replace both its BDUs and DCUs with the Marine Corps Combat Utility Uniform (MCCUU), completely replacing them by April 2005.

U.S. Air Force
Along with the Army, the Air Force began issuing the DCU in 1992 and remained its primary desert uniform until 2011. The U.S. Air Force officially replaced the BDU and DCU on November 1, 2011 with the Airman Battle Uniform (ABU), though most airmen had been using the ABU for a couple years before that date.

U.S. Navy
The United States Navy issued the DCU from 1993 until 2010 when it was replaced by the arid variant of the Navy Working Uniform (NWU), known as the NWU Type II. The DCU was retired by the navy in late 2012.

U.S. Coast Guard
The DCU was introduced to the Coast Guard sometime in the 1990s. The DCU and BDU were formally retired by the USCG in 2012.

Combat Uniform Versions

Twill Fabric DCU (1990-1991) 
The first version produced in 1990 and 1991 and fielded mainly by the USAF during the Gulf War, later being heavily used in Somalia by the Army. The fabric had the same 50% cotton and 50% nylon composition and twill weave as the DBDU. The cut was based on the second pattern DBDU which had no elbow, knee and between legs reinforcements.

100% Cotton Ripstop DCU (1991-1993) 
During Desert Storm and Desert Shield, Gen. Schwarzkopf redirected many complains from his troops back to the DOD, his concerns contributed to the fielding of the Desert Boots and also the 2nd pattern DBDU. But the unhappiness of the troops with the issued uniforms for the war would persist. As a response for such situation, several modifications were made to the DCU. Much like what happened to the BDU after Operation Urgent Fury. This DCU version presents the fabric of the HWBDU(Hot Weather Battle Dress Uniform), and keeps the details of the 1st pattern DBDU, being the reinforcements and the lining on the back of the shirt. The easiest way to tell this version apart from the others is looking for the waist adjust straps it has below the sleeves. It is possible Delta Operators wore it during Op. Gothic Serpeant as they were prioritized by logistics. But other units probably remained with twill fabric DCU as it was already available since 1990 and 1991.

Poplin Ripstop DCU (1994-1996) 
Following the developments made for the EHWBDU(Enhanced Hot Weather Battle Dress Uniform), a new DCU version was made. The contract label describes it as Poplin Windproof Ripstop, made of 50% Nylon 50% Cotton, mirroring the new BDU uniform. But unlike the latter, it presents no elbow and knee reinforcements just like the Twirl fabric.

Ripstop Fabric DCU (1997-2004) 
The last definitive version of the desert uniform. It is a mirror from the EHWBDU, carrying elbow and knee reinforcements, and also wrist adjustment The fabric remained 50% Nylon 50% Cotton ripstop. This DCU version is separated into two versions. one having a shorter collar and another with a longer collar(Nicknamed Elvis Collar by troops). It is believed the Elvis collar was designed for usage with armor vests. The Ripstop DCU is the most seen during The War in Iraq and Afghanistan. However due to logistical problems it is possible to see many photos of servicemen wearing earlier versions of the uniform.

Close Combat Uniform (2004) 
The CCU was an experimental uniform produced both on M81 Woodland Camouflage and Desert Camouflage Pattern, a bridge between the older uniforms and the new ACU. It appropriated some behaviors from Special Forces, Mostly Rangers, Seals, Delta Force, Green Berets and Marsoc. Since Vietnam Green Berets had the habit of sewing extra pockets on the sleeves of their Jungle Fatigues, and this tradition persisted through every generation. The BDU and DCU would be modified as well, and such modification is known as Raid Mod. The CCU was designed with this in mind, having waist pockets removed, and added pockets to the arms, alongside these, many other modifications were made. Mandarin collar closed by velcros, wrist adjustment by velcro, tilted chest pockets closed by velcros. On the trousers calf pockets and tilted cargo pockets. The ACU kept much of the modifications, making slight adjustments, and adding insert for knee and elbow soft protectors and also IR reflectors to the arm pockets.

Users

Current
: Used by Argentinian troops in peacekeeping operations.
: Used by Armenian peacekeepers in Iraq.
: Used by Azeri peacekeepers in Iraq.
: Used by Bosnian troops in Afghanistan.
: DCU was Main camouflage pattern employed by Georgian units in Iraq, also saw usage in opening stages of Georgian mission in Afghanistan before being replaced by MultiCam, still in limited usage by Georgian Special Operations Forces.

: Used by Israeli military in OPFOR capacity.

Former
 : Known to be used by Afghan commandos working in Task Force 444.
: Used by OPFOR during the 1990s and 2000s for war games.

: Used until 2013, where SloCam was adopted.

, replaced by the Army Combat Uniform in the late 2000s
, replaced by the Marine Corps Combat Utility Uniform in the mid-2000s
, replaced by the Navy Working Uniform in the early 2010s
, replaced by the Airman Battle Uniform in the early 2010s

References

Bibliography

External links
 GlobalSecurity page detailing DCU

1989 in military history
United States military uniforms
Camouflage patterns
History of fashion
Military camouflage
United States Air Force uniforms
Military equipment introduced in the 1990s